Giselbert II (died between 993 and 1010) was the count of Bergamo. He was a member of the dynasty known to historians as the Giselbertiners (or Giselbertini).

Life
Giselbert was the son of Lanfranc I of Bergamo. He is first documented as count of Bergamo in 961 (although he probably had held the position for some time before this).

Giselbert supported Otto I, Holy Roman Emperor against Berengar II of Italy. As a reward, in 970 Otto I granted Giselbert II property in the counties of Bergamo, Brescia, Como and Pavia, which had been confiscated from Count Bernard of Pavia. In 976 Otto II appointed Giselbert II count palatine of Bergamo.

Marriage and children
With his wife, Anselda (or Alsinda) of Turin, daughter of Arduin Glaber, Giselbert II had several children, including: 
Lanfranc II of Bergamo
Maginfred
Arduin I
Gisela, wife of Hugh of Milan (son of Otbert II, Margrave of Milan)
Richelida, wife of Boniface III of Tuscany

Notes

References
F. Menant, ‘Les Giselbertins, comtes du comté de Bergame et comtes palatins,’ in Formazione e strutture dei ceti dominanti nel medioevo (1988), pp. 115–186.
J. Jarnut, Bergamo 568-1098. Verfassungs-, Sozial- und Wirtschaftsgeschichte einer lombardischen Stadt im Mittelalter (Wiesbaden, 1977). 
A. Bedina, 'Giselberto,' in Dizionario Biografico degli Italiani - Volume 56 (2001)
E. Hlawitschka, Franken, Alemannen, Bayern und Burgunder in Oberitalien, 774-962: Zum Verständnis der fränkischen Königsherrschaft in Italien (Freiburg im Breisgau, 1960), accessible online: Genealogie Mittelalter

External links
 Giselberto, son of Lanfranc

People from Bergamo
10th-century Italian nobility